The Kurnell Story is a 1957 industrial film directed by Ken G. Hall about the construction of the Kurnell Oil Refinery in Sydney. It was Hall's last movie.

External links

The Kurnell Story at National Film and Sound Archive

1957 films
Australian documentary films
1950s English-language films